The Midwest Intercollegiate Football Conference (MIFC) was a football-only NCAA Division II conference formed for the 1990 football season. The conference was formed as the result of a merger of the football only Heartland Collegiate Conference and the football playing members of the Great Lakes Intercollegiate Athletic Conference (GLIAC). The membership in the MIFC was a somewhat unstable occurrence with membership ranging from 11 members when it formed in 1990 to 14 members in the final 1998 season.

Membership history
The MIFC formed as a result of the merger of the Heartland Conference with the GLIAC football playing members prior to the 1990 football season. The conference started play in 1990 with the following members.

From the Heartland Conference: Saint Joseph's College, Ashland University, Valparaiso University, University of Indianapolis and Butler University.

From the GLIAC: Ferris State University, Grand Valley State University, Hillsdale College, Northern Michigan University, Saginaw Valley State University and Wayne State University.

Membership changes came quickly and often to the MIFC. The first change occurred after 1992 season when Butler and Valparaiso left and were replaced by Northwood University and the University of St. Francis for the 1993 season. The next change came in the 1994 season when Michigan Technological University joined the conference. The next change occurred after the 1995 season when St. Joseph's left the conference. The final membership change occurred in 1998 when the University of Findlay, Mercyhurst College, and Westminster College all joined the conference. St. Francis left the conference following the 1998 season and the MIFC was merged with the GLIAC and the GLIAC resumed sponsoring football starting with the 1999 season. When the MIFC ceased membership all members of the MIFC were all sports members of the GLIAC except Indianapolis who joined the GLIAC as a football only member of the GLIAC starting in 1999.

Membership timeline

References

 
1990 establishments in the United States
1999 disestablishments in the United States